The Road to Fallujah is a 2009 American documentary film directed by Mark Manning and written by Manning and Natalie Kalustian.

Synopsis
The documentary follows the story of Mark Manning, the only westerner to live among the residents of Fallujah, Iraq, following the November 2004 battle that destroyed the city.

Interviews
 Rana al Aiouby - Humanitarian aid worker and Journalist
 Tariq Ali - Historian, novelist and political analyst
 Reza Aslan - Religion scholar
 Juan E. Campo, Ph.D. - Professor of Islamic Studies and the History of Religions, UCSB
 Dr. Hameed Tajeldin - Former Medical Doctor, Fallujah
 Paul D. Eaton - Major General US Army, Ret. Commanding General: Effort to Rebuild Iraqi Security Forces
 Arun Gandhi - Peace leader
 Thich Nhat Hanh - Peace leader
 Katy Helvenston-Wettengal - Mother of Scott Helvenston and member of lawsuit against Blackwater Security
 Dahr Jamail - Unembedded journalist in Iraq, author of "Beyond the Green Zone"
 Adam Kokesh - Sergeant, Civil Affairs NCO, Fallujah
 Dennis Kucinich -- U.S. Congressman
 Mark Manning

 Nadia McCaffery
 Nir Rosen- Unembedded journalist in Iraq
 Desmond Tutu - Peace leader
 Captain Allen Vaught - Head of Civil Military Operations, Fallujah 2003, Army Special Operations Command
 Lt. Col. Michael Zacchea - USMC Reserve, Fallujah, Senior Advisor to 5th Battalion Iraqi Army
 Donna Zovko - Mother of Jerry Zovko (murdered Blackwater Security contractor) and member of lawsuit against Blackwater Security
 Tom Zovko - Brother of Jerry Zovko
 Maxine Waters - U.S. Congresswoman

Film festivals
 Atlanta Film Festival: Official selection - April 2009
 Newport Beach Film Festival: Official selection - April 2009
 Slamdance Film Festival - January 2009: Official selection
 Santa Barbara International Film Festival: Official selection - January 2009 (West Coast premiere)
 Miami International Film Festival: Official selection - March 2009 (East Coast premiere)
 Docuwest Film Festival: Official selection
 United Nations Association Film Festival: Official selection
 Temecula Valley International Film Festival: Official selection
 Bend Film Festival: Official selection

Accolades
 Honolulu International Film Festival: Winner (Excellence in film making)

References

External links
 
 
 Remember Fallujah 12 months following Fallujah
 The Children of Fallujah by Robert Fisk article exploring the after effects of phosphorus shells used during the November 2004 bombing of Fallujah

2009 films
American documentary films
2000s Arabic-language films
2000s English-language films
Documentary films about the Iraq War
2009 multilingual films
American multilingual films
2000s American films